Ling-Hsueh Tang is a Chinese Australian actress.

She is best known for her work as Dr. Kylie Preece on All Saints, an Australian hospital drama, and in 2001 she appeared on the cover of TV Week to promote the series. She has also appeared in the films Son of the Mask, Strange Planet and Ghost Rider. In addition to All Saints, Tang has made guest appearances on many prominent television series including Fireflies, Breakers, Children's Hospital, Sea Patrol and the mini-series Tribe.  In 2009, Tang was nominated for the Matilda Award for Best Actress in a Lead Role for her stage acting in a Queensland production of The Ghost Writer.

According to a report by the Australian Film Commission, Tang is considered a breakthrough actress given her racial background. She has been cast in several non ethnic-specific roles for mainstream shows, which is considered unusual for Australian broadcast television. Tang graduated from the theater program at Queensland University of Technology.

Partial filmography
Big Sky  (1 episode, 1997)
Fallen Angels (1997)
Children's Hospital (1997)
Breakers (TV) (1998)
Tribe (mini-series) (1999)
Strange Planet (1999)
Murder Call (1 episode, 2000)
All Saints (68 episodes, 1999–2002)
The Weakest Link: All Saints Special (2001)
Go Big (TV movie) (2004)
Fireflies  (4 episodes, 2004)
Son of the Mask (2005)
Ghost Rider (2007)
Sea Patrol (2 episodes, 2008–2009)
The Doctor Blake Mysteries (5 episodes, 2016)

References

External links

Australian television actresses
Living people
Queensland University of Technology alumni
Australian stage actresses
Australian people of Chinese descent
Australian children's television presenters
Year of birth missing (living people)
Australian women television presenters
Australian actresses of Chinese descent